Jean-Louis de la Corne de Chaptes, (b. October 23, 1666 – d. May 6, 1732) was from Chaptes, France. He arrived in New France in 1685 and, other than a trip home to France, served his whole adult life in the military. He achieved some military honours but little wealth and died leaving his wife in limited circumstances.

He established one of the most important families in New France and his four sons all did well. One son, Louis de la Corne, Chevalier de la Corne was both a successful soldier and fur trader while another son, Luc de la Corne became one of the wealthiest men in New France. A third son, François-Josué de la Corne Dubreuil was an active soldier and trader. All four were awarded the cross of Saint Louis as was Jean-Louis.

External links 

 Biography at the Dictionary of Canadian Biography Online

1666 births
1732 deaths
Order of Saint Louis recipients
People of New France